Parkneuk Sports Stadium was a greyhound racing and speedway track on Milton Street, Motherwell, North Lanarkshire, Scotland.

The track was situated west of Milton Street and built in 1949 on the site of the Parkneuk Colliery pit numbers 1 and 2. It also went by the name of The Stadium and the Lanarkshire Speedway and Sports Stadium. The greyhound racing was independent (unaffiliated to a governing body) and opened on 15 October. The Lanarkshire Eagles speedway team also rode at the venue from 1950-1954. It competed for many years with another independent greyhound track called the Clyde Valley Greyhound Track at the bottom of Airbles Road.

Greyhound racing ended in 1972 and the site today consists of the Daisy Park Community Centre and Our Lady of Good Aid Cathedral Primary School.

References

Defunct greyhound racing venues in the United Kingdom
Greyhound racing in Scotland
Defunct speedway venues in Scotland
1949 establishments in Scotland
1972 disestablishments in Scotland
Sports venues completed in 1949
Sports venues in North Lanarkshire
Sport in Motherwell
Buildings and structures in Motherwell